Prusinowo  is a settlement in the administrative district of Gmina Gryfice, within Gryfice County, West Pomeranian Voivodeship, in north-western Poland.

Before 1637 the area was part of the Duchy of Pomerania. In 1815–1945 it was part of the Province of Pomerania. For the history of the region, see History of Pomerania.

The settlement has a population of 565.

References

Prusinowo